Kaymak, sarshir, or qashta/ashta (  or   ) is a creamy  dairy food  similar to clotted cream, made from the milk of water buffalo, cows, sheep, or goats in Central Asia, some Balkan countries, some Caucasus countries, the countries of the Levant, Turkic regions, Iran and Iraq. In Poland, the name  refers to a confection similar to dulce de leche instead.

The traditional method of making kaymak is to boil the raw milk slowly, then simmer it for two hours over a very low heat. After the heat source is shut off, the cream is skimmed and left to chill (and mildly ferment) for several hours or days. Kaymak has a high percentage of milk fat, typically about 60%. It has a thick, creamy consistency (not entirely compact, because of milk protein fibers) and a rich taste.

Etymology
The word kaymak has Central Asian Turkic origins, possibly formed from the verb , which means 'melt' and 'molding of metal' in Turkic. The first written records of the word kaymak is in the well-known book of Mahmud al-Kashgari, .
This dairy food is called sarshir in Iran. This word means 'something which stands on the top of the milk'. They use this name because after boiling milk, a layer of fat stands on the top of the boiled milk.

Turkey

Shops in Turkey have been devoted to kaymak production and consumption for centuries. Kaymak is mainly consumed today for breakfast along with the traditional Turkish breakfast. One type of kaymak is found in the Afyonkarahisar region where the water buffalo are fed from the residue of poppy seeds pressed for oil. Kaymak is traditionally eaten with baklava and other Turkish desserts, fruit preserve and honey or as a filling in pancakes.

Balkans

Kajmak is most expensive when freshest—only a day or two old. It can keep for weeks in the refrigerator but becomes harder and loses quality. Kajmak can also be matured in dried animal skin sacks; one variation is called .  also describes the creamy foam in the Turkish coffee, and a lot of other coffees in the Balkans.

It is usually enjoyed as an appetizer or for Saturday morning breakfast, as Saturdays are market days with the best kajmak, but also as a condiment. Bulgarians, Bosnians, Montenegrins and Serbs consider it a national meal.

Iraq
Iraqi  is usually made from the rich fatty milk of cows or buffaloes, which are prevalent in the marshes of southern Iraq.

Iraqis like to serve  for breakfast with fresh bread, honey or jam.

Iran
In Iran,  is used to describe a different method which does not involve heating the milk, thus keeping enzymes and other cultures of the milk alive. The word kaymak is also used for the boiled method.  is a Turkish word used to describe this product among the Azari people of Iran.

Afghanistan
In Afghanistan,  or  has a thinner quality and is eaten for breakfast meals usually with bread. People typically top qaimak with honey, sugar, or mix it with jam. It can be spread on pastries or even added to milk tea. Qaimak can be purchased at grocery stores in Afghanistan or made at home. It is quite a long process to make at home, involving hours stirring the milk pot. Qaimak can be found at Afghan/Iranian grocery stores in the west, but is not as rich as homemade. While a lot qaimak variations are made from buffalo milk, Afghan qaimak can be made from cows' milk.

Georgia

In the Adjara region of Georgia, bordering Turkey,  is made from cow's milk in homes in the mountainous municipalities of Keda, Shuakhevi, and Khulo. It is typically eaten with Georgian cheese and/or bread, and is only rarely served in restaurants.

Greece
 ( is a soft cream cheese that can be spread on bread or used in cooking as a filling in food and for deserts.
You can also find Kaïmaki as a chewy ice cream that is flavoured with mastic.

See also
 Malai

Citations

References
 The Poppy Growers of İsmailköy (2002)
 Davidson, Alan. Oxford Companion to Food (1999). "Kaymak", pp. 428–429. 
 An Introduction into the Serbian Cuisine

External links

 The famous kaymak breakfast of "Pando Usta" at Beşiktaş, Istanbul
 Kaymak recipe

Appetizers
Balkan cuisine
Central Asian cuisine
Condiments
Fermented dairy products
Iranian cuisine
Iraqi cuisine
Indian cuisine
Middle Eastern cuisine
Turkish cuisine
Turkish words and phrases
Kyrgyz cuisine